A reflex is an involuntary movement in response to a stimulus.

Reflex also may refer to:

Titled works 
Reflex (game show) on BBC One
"The Reflex" (1984), single by Duran Duran
Reflex (novel) by Steven Gould
Reflex (magazine), Czech weekly

In software contexts 
ReFLEX, wireless paging protocol 
Borland Reflex, database management 
Reflex, a programming language developed by Facebook
Reflex (building design software), successor to Sonata

Bands and other organizations 
Reflex (group), Russian band
Re-Flex, British band 
Reflex Records

Other 
 Reflex (linguistics), an element of a language that developed from an earlier form
 Reflex Arena (video game)
 Reflex Math, A kids math website by ExploreLearning

See also
 Reflex camera
 Reflex (or reflector) sight